Gymnastics at the 2015 African Games in Brazzaville was held between September 2–6, 2015.

Medal summary

Medal table

Results

Aerobic Gymnastics

Results

External links 
 African games, quick facts

2015
2015 African Games
African Games